Goodenia heterochila, commonly known as serrated goodenia,  is a species of flowering plant in the family Goodeniaceae and is endemic to arid areas of Australia. It is an erect or ascending perennial herb with lance-shaped to egg-shaped stem leaves with the narrow end towards the base, and racemes of yellow flowers with a brownish centre.

Description

Taxonomy and naming
Goodenia heterochila was first formally described in 1863 by Ferdinand von Mueller in Fragmenta Phytographiae Australiae from specimens collected by Frederick George Waterhouse during the John McDouall Stuart expedition of 1862.
The specific epithet (heterochila) mean "unequal-edged", referring to the lower corolla lobes.

Distribution and habitat
This goodenia grows in sandy soil in arid areas of the Northern Territory, South Australia, Queensland and Western Australia.

Conservation status
Goodenia heterochila is classified as "not threatened" by the Government of Western Australia Department of Parks and Wildlife and of "least concern" under the Northern Territory Government Territory Parks and Wildlife Conservation Act 1976 and the Queensland Government Nature Conservation Act 1992.

References

heterochila
Eudicots of Western Australia
Plants described in 1863
Taxa named by Ferdinand von Mueller
Flora of South Australia
Flora of the Northern Territory
Flora of Queensland